Dagsnäs Castle is a castle in Sweden, located  south of Skara at Lake Hornborga.

Over the years several runestones from the region have been moved to the castle grounds, including Vg 59 from Norra Härene, Vg 67 from Saleby, Vg 122 from Abrahamstorp, Vg 184 from Smula, and Vg 186 from Timmele.

Castles in Västra Götaland County